Alin Andrei Predescu (born 18 November 1995) is a Romanian professional footballer who plays as a midfielder.

References

External links

1995 births
Living people
Footballers from Bucharest
Romanian footballers
Association football forwards
FC Steaua București players
Grasshopper Club Zürich players
Liga I players
CS Pandurii Târgu Jiu players
CS Gaz Metan Mediaș players
Liga II players
CS Luceafărul Oradea players
CSA Steaua București footballers
Romanian expatriate footballers
Romanian expatriate sportspeople in Switzerland
Expatriate footballers in Switzerland